As of July 2022, 321 cricket grounds have hosted at least one match of women's One Day International (ODI) cricket. One Day Internationals were the second form of international women's cricket to be introduced, after Test matches. The first women's ODIs were played at the 1973 World Cup, and more than 1,300 women's ODIs have been played since. Twenty-nine countries have hosted at least one women's ODI match.

List of grounds
Note: venues marked with a dagger (†) have had matches played on multiple grounds within the venue, but are counted as a single ground for the purposes of this list.
As of 21 January 2023 (WODI 1311):

Grounds by country
Last updated: 21 January 2023

See also
 List of Test cricket grounds
 List of women's Test cricket grounds
 List of One Day International cricket grounds
 List of Twenty20 International cricket grounds
 List of women's Twenty20 International cricket grounds

References

External links 
Cricinfo – Grounds

One Day, women
Grounds
One